Robert Feild was Archdeacon of Cleveland from 1675 until his death on 9 September 1680.

Feild was educated at Trinity College, Oxford.  He became a Prebendary of York in 1670; Rector of Barton in Fabis in 1671; and a Canon of Southwell in 1676.

He was buried at York Minster.

References

17th-century English Anglican priests
Alumni of Trinity College, Oxford
Archdeacons of Cleveland
1680 deaths
York Minster